Townsel ist the name of:
 Derrick Townsel (born 1988), a former American football wide receiver
 James G. Townsel (1935–2020), American neuroscientist and professor at Meharry Medical College